Tricolia landinii is a species of sea snail, a marine gastropod mollusk in the family Phasianellidae.

Distribution
This species occurs in the Mediterranean Sea off Sicily.

References

Phasianellidae
Gastropods described in 2007